Walk into Light is the debut solo album released by Jethro Tull frontman Ian Anderson, released in 1983. (The album A was originally intended to be released as an Ian Anderson album, but instead was released as a Jethro Tull album.)

Although a solo album, Walk into Light was perhaps the most collaborative work Anderson had done up to that point, as then-Jethro Tull keyboardist Peter-John Vettese co-wrote five songs and had a strong influence on the album's style and sound.

Track listing

Personnel 
 Ian Anderson – vocals, flute, guitar, bass, keyboards
 Peter-John Vettese – keyboards

External links
 
 Cup of Wonder
 Progressive Archives

References 

Ian Anderson albums
1983 debut albums
Chrysalis Records albums
Albums produced by Ian Anderson